Don't Keep Me Waiting may refer to:

 "Don't Keep Me Waiting", a song by Montell Jordan from This Is How We Do It
 "Don't Keep Me Waiting", a song by Silk from Lose Control
 "Don't Keep Me Waiting", a song by Britney Spears from Femme Fatale
 "Don't Keep Me Waiting", a song by Sharleen Spiteri from Melody

See also 
 Waiting (disambiguation)